Croomia japonica is a plant species native to China and Japan. It grows in mixed forests.

References

Flora of China
Flora of Japan
Stemonaceae
Plants described in 1865